Quarteto Novo is a 1967 album by the Brazilian jazz quartet Quarteto Novo. It was the band's only album.

Critical reception
NPR, as part of its "Take Five" series, called the album "a pastoral romp through the Brazilian countryside, long streamers of joy flowing behind."

Track listing
 "O Ôvo" (Geraldo Vandré, Hermeto Pascoal) - 02:17 
 "Fica Mal Com Deus" (Geraldo Vandré) - 3:27 
 "Canto Geral" (Geraldo Vandré, Hermeto Pascoal) - 03:43 
 "Algodão" – (Luiz Gonzaga, Zé Dantas) - 07:19 
 "Canta Maria" (Geraldo Vandré) - 2:45
 "Síntese" (Heraldo do Monte) - 2:37 
 "Misturada" (Airto, Geraldo Vandré) - 04:15
 "Vim De Sant'ana" (Theo de Barros) - 05:09

Personnel
Theo de Barros - bass, guitar
Heraldo do Monte - Viola caipira, guitar
Hermeto Pascoal - flute
Airto - percussion, drums

References

1967 albums
Quarteto Novo albums
Théo de Barros albums
Heraldo do Monte albums
Airto Moreira albums
Hermeto Pascoal albums